The Wych Elm cultivar Ulmus glabra 'Pendula Macrophylla', was first mentioned by Maxwell ex Journal of the Royal Horticultural Society 18: 91, 1895, as U. montana (: glabra) var. pendula macrophylla, but without description.

Description
Not available.

Pests and diseases
The clone is very susceptible to Dutch elm disease.

Cultivation
Extremely rare in Europe; not known in North America.

Accessions
Royal Botanic Gardens, Kew, UK. Cloned from tree growing at Strömparterren :sv:Strömparterren, Stockholm. Acc. no. not known.

Nurseries

Centrum voor Botanische Verrijking vzw, Kampenhout, Belgium.

References

Wych elm cultivar
Ulmus articles missing images
Ulmus